Engineering World Health (EWH) is a non-profit organization that works with hospitals and clinics that serve resource-poor communities of the developing world. EWH's focus is on the repair and maintenance of medical equipment - rather than donation - and on building local capacity to manage and maintain the equipment without international aid.

Engineering professors Robert Malkin and Mohammad Kiani established EWH in Memphis in 2001. In 2004, Dr. Malkin and EWH relocated to Duke University, which has been an active partner since that time. As a result of this partnership, EWH is headquartered in Durham, NC. In 2008, EWH received a multi-year grant from the Wallace H. Coulter Foundation.

Activities

Summer & January Institutes 
Engineering World Health's signature program is the Summer & January Institutes. These service abroad programs engage university-level science and engineering students to use their skills and knowledge to make a direct impact on hospitals in developing countries. Participants spend three to nine weeks in Nicaragua, Rwanda, Tanzania, Guatemala, Cambodia, or Nepal learning hands-on technical skills and the local language, and then working in local hospitals to install, repair, and maintain medical equipment. Participants also train local staff, empowering them to use and maintain equipment, to create lasting improvements in partner hospitals.

Since 2004, over 600 participants have repaired almost 5,800 pieces of hospital equipment, worth an estimated US$12 million.

BMET Training Program 
Seeking a sustainable solution to hospital equipment repair, Engineering World Health started a biomedical equipment technician (BMET) training program in late 2009, in partnership with the GE Foundation. Through a three to four year curriculum tailored to each country's needs, EWH works with a local educational institution and Ministry of Health to train BMETs to international standards, train local teachers to carry on the program in the long term, and establish a permanent, accredited BMET training program.

The first BMET Training program began in Rwanda, and has since placed trained BMETs in every district in the country. Thanks to further funding from the GE Foundation, EWH has completed a training program Honduras and turned it over to local leadership, and, as of 2016, is training BMETs in Cambodia, Nigeria, and Ethiopia.

BMET Library 
In 2016, EWH launched an open-source digital library for BMETs, with the goal of facilitating and fostering information exchange among engineers and technicians around the world. This library is a collection of open source books and publications containing information useful for training (BMETs), particularly in the developing countries where EWH is working.

Other programs 
In the summer of 2021, EWH offered a free virtual design program for students in the United States, Lebanon and Jordan. The program, titled Virtual Engineering Innovation and Cultural Exchange, was focused on healthcare design in low-resource settings. It was sponsored by the Stevens Initiative, a project funded by the United States Department of State, Bezos Family Foundation, and the Governments of Morocco and the United Arab Emirates, and administered by the Aspen Institute.

Organization

Board of directors 
As of 2021, the EWH's board of directors is made up of the following:
 Michael R. Tracy, PhD - Ethicon (Chair)
 Jessica Feddersen, CPA - Danaher Corporation (Treasurer)
 Mhoire Murphy, MBA - McKinsey & Company (Secretary)
 Sreeram Dhurjaty, PhD - Dhurjaty Electronics Consulting
 William E. Gannon, Jr., MD, MBA - Capital City Technical Consulting
 Mark Goldman, MBA - Philips Healthcare
 Barbara Grenell, PhD - Preferred Health Strategies, Ltd.
 Mohammad Kiani, PhD, FAHA - Temple University
 Corinna E. Lathan, PhD, PE - AnthroTronix, Inc.
 Eric Nodiff, JD - Schaeffer Venaglia Handler & Fitzsimons, LLP
 Cathy Peck, CPA - Professor, Fresno Pacific University
 Tojan B. Rahhal, PhD - Engineering World Health (Ex oficio)
 Robert Malkin, PhD, PE - Duke University (Emeritus)
 Lynn Toby Fisher, JD (In memoriam)

Chapters 
Engineering World Health has student chapters at 45 universities around the world. These Chapters engage students in activities as design projects for the developing world, biomedical equipment repair and evaluation, and raising awareness of global health challenges. Chapters may also get involved in the EWH Design Competition in which teams of engineering students submit a design directed at the needs of developing country healthcare. The top three teams are selected by an independent panel of judges and are then rewarded with cash prizes, giving them a chance to implement their device.

US chapters

Partners 
EWH's program and funding partners as of August 2022 include:
 Aspen Institute
 Association for the Advancement of Medical Instrumentation
 Australian Aid
 Biomedical Engineering Society
 Cantel Medical Corporation
 Danaher Corporation
 Duke University Health System
 Ethicon
 Flemming Topsøe
 George Mason University
 Illinois Institute of Technology
 Makerere University
 MedShare
 National Instruments
 Notre Dame University–Louaize
 Rochester Institute of Technology
 Rose–Hulman Institute of Technology
 Technical University of Denmark
 Texas A&M University
 United Way
 University of New South Wales
 Vontier
 Wallace H. Coulter Foundation

Former partners include Abbott Laboratories, BD, Biogen, Coca-Cola Company, General Electric, Lagos University Teaching Hospital, McKesson Corporation, the Nigerian Ministry of Health and St. Jude Children's Research Hospital.

References

External links
 Engineering World Health official site

Medical and health organizations based in Tennessee
Appropriate technology organizations
Engineering organizations
International medical and health organizations